"Backseat" is a song written and recorded by American hip hop duo New Boyz, American production duo The Cataracs, and singer Dev. The song was released as a single on February 15, 2011 as a digital download in the United States and served as the second single from New Boyz' second album Too Cool to Care. The song contains elements of hip-hop, rap, electropop, and dance music and contains use of Auto-Tune on some of the vocals.

Music video
A music video was directed by Jake Davis. It was premiered on March 7, 2011. It features appearances by featured artist Dev in shiny glittering dress, which changes into a white-and-pink dress with a quarter of a pyramid and The Cataracs. The first few scenes were shot with a silver Mercedes-Benz 300SL, with appearance by all artists. The scene changes to a "party in a club" scene after the second chorus, and the back seats of a car, given the title of the song.  It ends with New Boyz being covered by the shadows. Ironically, the music video contains cars that actually don't feature back seats as well as a mustang in place of the Camaro that is not orange. Also in the video, car miniatures were used to create an illusion of it being full-scale models.

Track listing
 iTunes released "Backseat" as a deluxe single.

 Deluxe single

Charts
"Backseat" debuted at #37 on the Billboard Hot 100 and has peaked at #26 in its twelfth week, becoming the duo's third top forty hit in the United States. As of July 2011, the song has now sold over 1,000,000 digital copies.

Year-end charts

References

2011 singles
2011 songs
New Boyz songs
Dev (singer) songs
The Cataracs songs
Universal Republic Records singles
Song recordings produced by the Cataracs
Songs written by David Singer-Vine
Songs written by Kshmr
Songs written by Dev (singer)